Hip Ensemble is an album recorded by American drummer Roy Haynes in 1971 for the Mainstream label.

Reception

AllMusic awarded the album 4 stars and its review by Ron Wynn states "This explosive session helped cement the reputations of George Adams and Hannibal Marvin Peterson".

Track listing
All compositions by Roy Haynes except as indicated
 "Equipoise" (Stanley Cowell) - 4:18   
 "I'm So High"  - 4:10   
 "Tangiers"  - 5:59   
 "Nothing Ever Changes My Love for You" (Marvin Fisher, Jack Segal) - 4:13   
 "Satan's Mysterious Feeling" (George Adams) - 6:38   
 "You Name It/List Ev'ry Voice and Sing" (Adams/James Weldon Johnson, John Rosamond Johnson) - 9:26

Personnel 
Roy Haynes - drums, timpani
Marvin Peterson - trumpet
George Adams - tenor saxophone, flute
Carl Schroeder - piano
Teruo Nakamura - bass
Mervin Bronson - Fender bass
Lawrence Killian - congas
Elwood Johnson - bongos, tambourine

References 

1971 albums
Roy Haynes albums
Mainstream Records albums
Albums produced by Bob Shad